Arefyev or Arefiev, female form Arefyeva, is a Russian surname that may refer to:

 Aleksei Arefyev (born 1971), Soviet and Russian footballer
 Artyom Arefyev (born 1984), Russian Paralympian athlete
 Nikolai Arefyev (1979–2017), Russian footballer
 Nikolay Arefiev (politician) (born 1949), Russian politician
 Viktor Arefyev (born 1975), Ukrainian footballer
 Olga Arefieva (born 1966), Russian musician

Russian-language surnames